Conor Mullervy (born April 8, 1988) is an American professional racing cyclist. He rode in the men's team time trial at the 2015 UCI Road World Championships.

Major results
2013
 6th Tobago Cycling Classic

References

External links

1988 births
Living people
American male cyclists
Place of birth missing (living people)